Hallucinogen persisting perception disorder (HPPD) is a non-psychotic disorder in which a person experiences apparent lasting or persistent visual hallucinations or perceptual distortions after a previous use of drugs, including but not limited to psychedelics, dissociatives, entactogens, THC, and SSRIs. Despite being designated as a hallucinogen-specific disorder, the specific contributory role of psychedelic drugs is unknown. 

The hallucinations and perceptual changes consist of, but are not limited to, visual snow, trails and after images (palinopsia), light fractals on flat surfaces, intensified colors, altered motion perception, pareidolia, micropsia, and macropsia. People who have never previously taken drugs have also reported some symptoms associated with HPPD (such as floaters and visual snow).

HPPD is a DSM-5 diagnosis with diagnostic code 292.89 (F16.983). For the diagnosis to be made, other psychological, psychiatric, or neurological conditions must be ruled out and it must cause distress in everyday life.  In the ICD-10, the diagnosis code F16.7 corresponds most closely to the clinical picture. HPPD is rarely recognized amongst both hallucinogen users and psychiatrists, and is often misdiagnosed as a substance-induced psychosis.

Newer research makes a distinction between HPPD I and HPPD II. The more drastic cases, as seen in HPPD II, are believed to be caused by abuse of psychedelics as well as comorbid mental disorders. Some people who have this disorder report that they developed symptoms of HPPD after their first use of such drugs (most notably LSD). Because research regarding HPPD is currently lacking, there is little information on effective treatments, its aetiology and relationship to other disorders, and precise mechanism.

History
In 1898, the English physician and intellectual Havelock Ellis reported a heightened sensitivity to what he described as "the more delicate phenomena of light and shade and color" for a prolonged period of time after he was exposed to the psychedelic drug mescaline. This may have been one of the first recorded symptoms of what would later be called HPPD. Hallucinogen-persisting perception disorder was first described in 1954, with other observations made in early psychedelic research. Horowitz first introduced the term flashbacks, referring to recurrent and spontaneous perceptual distortions and unbidden images. When these “flashbacks” present as recurrent, but without a current acute, or chronic hallucinogen intake, the disturbance is referred to as HPPD. Horowitz classified also three types of visual flashbacks: (a) perceptual distortions (e.g., seeing haloes around objects); (b) heightened imagery (e.g., visual experiences as much more vivid and dominant in one’s thoughts); and (c) recurrent unbidden images (e.g., subjects see objects that are not there). LSD therapist Stanislav Grof noted an HPPD phenomenon in his book LSD Psychotherapy from 1978, which noted that
“[l]ong after the pharmacological effect of the drug has subsided, the patient may still report anomalies in color-perception, blurred vision, after-images, spontaneous imagery, alterations in body image, intensification of hearing, ringing in the ears, or various strange physical feelings.”

HPPD has been introduced under the diagnosis of Post- hallucinogen Perception Disorder in 1987 within the DSM-III-R. Subsequently, the DSM-IV-TR recognized the syndrome as Hallucinogen-Persisting Perception Disorder (Flashbacks) (code 292.89) (15). The Neurosensory Research Foundation  was founded by HPPD sufferers to promote research and awareness around the condition. Subsequently, in 2021, the Perception Restoration Foundation  was launched to bolster efforts for research, awareness and harm reduction. In 2022, journalists at Psymposia and New York Magazine revealed that a participant in MAPS' landmark MDMA trials for PTSD developed post-psychedelic visual effects similar to HPPD. Subclinical HPPD phenomena have occurred in other trial settings.

Symptoms
Typical symptoms of the disorder include: halos or auras surrounding objects, trails following objects in motion, difficulty distinguishing between colors, apparent shifts in the hue of a given item, the illusion of movement in a static setting, visual snow, distortions in the dimensions of a perceived object, intensified hypnagogic & hypnopompic hallucinations, monocular double vision, seeing an excessive amount of floaters and blue field entopic phenomenon. The visual alterations experienced by those with HPPD are not homogeneous and there appear to be individual differences in both the number and intensity of symptoms.

Visual aberrations can occur periodically in healthy individuals – e.g. afterimages after staring at a light, noticing floaters inside the eye, blue field entoptic phenomenon or seeing specks of light in a darkened room. However, in people with HPPD, symptoms seem typically to be worse, but complication comes from the additional roles played anxiety and fixation. Indeed, anxiety has been implicated in visual perceptual effects similar to HPPD,  and authors have recognized the crucial role of attending to underlying anxiety and panic in recovering from the disorder. 

There is some uncertainty about to what degree visual snow constitutes a true HPPD symptom. There are individuals who have never used a drug which could have caused the onset, but yet experience the same grainy vision reported by those with HPPD, like people with the closely-linked neurological disorder known as Visual snow syndrome. There are a few potential reasons for this, the most obvious of which being the theory that the drug usage may exaggerate the intensity of visual snow. At the same time, beyond the characteristic visual snow symptom, there is considerable overlap between the conditions, including after-images, palinopsia, tinnitus, dissociation and free-floating anxiety, leading some to suggest that HPPD shares a strong relationship with Visual snow syndrome. Visual snow syndrome is defined as lacking any known cause and is specifically distinguished from HPPD in its nosology, yet further research may clarify the relationship.
HPPD usually has a visual manifestation, but some hallucinogenic and psychiatric drugs affect the auditory sense and can produce tinnitus-like symptoms as a side effect, and there's many anecdotal reports of people getting tinnitus with their HPPD.

A significant number of those reporting HPPD also describe comorbid depersonalization-derealization and anxiety disorders. Anxiety, PTSD
 and panic can promote depersonalization-derealization and visual disturbances, and vice versa, so these features may run in multidirectional relationships. Abraham suggested that all three can arise from a broader mechanism of disinhibition in sensory perception, affect and sense-of-self occasioned by psychedelic experience. It is not uncommon for depersonalization-derealization to be the most distressing symptom of the condition. 

According to a 2016 review, there are two theorized subtypes of the condition. Type 1 HPPD is where people experience random, brief flashbacks. Type 2 HPPD entails experiencing persistent changes to vision, which may vary in intensity. This model has faced scrutiny, however, due to "flashbacks" often being considered a separate condition and not always a perceptual one.

Causes

HPPD is not related to psychosis due to the fact people affected by the disorder can easily distinguish their visual disturbances from reality. A vast list of psychoactive substances has been identified and linked with the development of this condition, including lysergamides like LSD and LSA, tryptamines like psilocybin and DMT, phenethylamines like 2C-B, MDMA, MDA and mescaline. Dissociatives such as ketamine and dextromethorphan as well as cannabis and synthetic cannabinoids, salvia divinorum, datura and iboga are also known to trigger HPPD. It is therefore clear that HPPD is not strictly associated with psychedelic consumption as a number of hallucination-inducing substances may be correlated with its arising. For some, the dosage and how frequently one uses these substances doesn't seem to matter in the development of this condition, since there are several reports in the literature where patients were diagnosed after a single use. This strongly indicates that there may be a genetic predisposition to this condition. It also seems that combining recreational or medical drugs that act on the 5HT2-a receptors, like SSRIs, drastically increases the chances of developing HPPD due to the drug-drug interaction.

The exact pathophysiologic mechanism underlying HPPD is poorly understood. The primary neurobiological hypothesis is that persistent hallucinations are the result of chronic disinhibition of visual processors and subsequent dysfunction in the central nervous system following consumption of hallucinogens. Chronic disinhibition may occur from destruction and/or dysfunction of cortical serotonergic inhibitory interneurons involving the inhibitory neurotransmitter, gamma-aminobutyric acid (GABA). This ultimately can cause disruption of the normal neurological mechanisms that are responsible for filtration of unnecessary stimuli in the brain. On a macroscopic level, the lateral geniculate nucleus (LGN) of the thalamus, which is important in visual processing, has also been implicated in the pathophysiology of HPPD. 

Other researchers have suggested HPPD may be related to drug-induced elevations in neuroplasticity - an effect also noted to occur for SSRIs. Reverse neuroplasticity effects may account for anecdotal reports of individuals treating their HPPD symptoms with further psychedelic drug use, while others report significant deterioriations in their symptoms. 

Which drugs are most prone to causing HPPD is not entirely known. While LSD has been described as the leading cause of HPPD, this may be a function of LSD's historically higher relative popularity as a recreational psychedelic drug. Popularity effects may explain the high proportion of cases precipitated by cannabis. A recent clinical review found no significant difference in the induction of subclinical visual phenomena between MDMA, LSD and psilocybin. Curiously, lasting visual effects have also occurred as complications of benzodiazepine withdrawal syndrome. 

Being characterized by clinical distress and impairment, however, HPPD is also shaped by psychosocial factors. There is tentative evidence that those who develop distressing HPPD have higher trait anxiety, or experienced elevations in baseline anxiety from possibly negative psychedelic experiences. Elevations in anxiety, and anxious responses to visual and related symptoms, may provoke direct elevations in symptom intensity and fuel the distress that defines HPPD as a clinical entity. Certain core beliefs and automatic thoughts are observed to occur among those reporting HPPD: fears of brain damage, a 'never-ending trip', the development of schizophrenia or a related psychosis spectrum disorder, a more generalized concern surrounding insanity, and destructive thoughts concerning the loss of one's previous self or a new identity centred on brokenness and alienation from others. Being a drug-related disorder, HPPD is therefore vulnerable to internalized anti-drug stigma, specifically around 'flashbacks' and 'brain frying', which were heavily propagandized in prohibitionist campaigns in the 20th-century.

Treatment
As of January 2022 there is no officially recognized cure or therapy for HPPD, but those affected with HPPD are heavily advised to discontinue all recreational drug use. Discontinuation of legal stimulants, like caffeine, taurine, and nicotine, may also be beneficial, as many of them are thought to increase symptoms in the short term.. Improving sleep quality, reducing anxiety, lowering screen use, improving diet quality and pursuing regular exercise are encouraged as general lifestyle changes. To decrease fixation and monitoring behaviors with visual symptoms, increased focus on external tasks may also be encouraged. 

Antipsychotics such as aripiprazole or risperidone intended to treat mental disorders like schizophrenia should only be taken in careful consultation with a psychiatrist experienced in HPPD. The success rate of antipsychotics as a treatment method for HPPD is still debated. Two young men with HPPD and schizophrenia as a comorbidity experienced a remission of visual perceptual disturbance during a 6-month follow-up observation under treatment with risperidone. There was a case study in 2013 where oral risperidone was also successful for treating HPPD. In other cases risperidone has shown no effect on HPPD or where it had a paradoxical effect and lead to permanent symptom exacerbation.

 Lamotrigine an anticonvulsant is the most popular medication for HPPD treatment. In the case of a 36-year-old man with HPPD for 18-years, the complex visual perception disorders largely resolved within 12 months after initiation of treatment with lamotrigine. In another case a 33-year-old woman developed HPPD after abusing LSD for a year long at the age of 18. She reported afterimages, perception of movement in her peripheral visual fields, blurring of small patterns, halo effects, and macro- and micropsia. Previous treatment with antidepressants and risperidone failed to ameliorate these symptoms. Upon commencing drug therapy with lamotrigine, these complex visual disturbances receded almost completely. There are also many anecdotal reports on Lamotrigine alleviating some of the symptoms. Lamotrigine is considered a possible treatment option for HPPD. Lamotrigine is generally well tolerated with a relative lack of adverse effects.
 Clonidine an antihypertensive that a pilot study of eight patients suggested could help significantly alleviate "LSD-related flashbacks."
 In a case study of two subjects with synthetic cannabis-induced HPPD the symptoms significant improvement with Clonazepam treatment. In a 2003 study 16 people with LSD-induced HPPD reported a significant relief and the presence of only mild symptomatology during clonazepam administration. And as with Lamotrigine, there are many anecdotal reports of Clonazepam greatly decreasing symptoms at >1.5 mg doses
 Other medical drugs that people have reported some symptom reduction with is the anticonvulsants Gabapentin, Levetiracetam and Valproic acid.

A 2022 case reported indicated promise for brain stimulation therapy for a longstanding HPPD patient  

Outside of pharmacotherapy, recovery from HPPD as a clinical entity - that, is involving distress and impairment - can come about through psychological and social means. Case reports of psychotherapy for HPPD suggest that anxiety reduction, muscle relaxation, and re-framing one's visual phenomena through personal destigmatization and normalization may be helpful. Some authors have suggested that HPPD be better designated as a particular somatic symptom disorder rather than a disorder defined centrally by hallucinogen use. Cognitive behavioral therapy has shown promise for somatic symptom disorders, as well as related distress from tinnitus. CBT has likewise shown promise for depersonalization-derealization disorder, which occurs as a common comorbidity to HPPD and seems to share many of the same catastrophic thoughts. The Perception Restoration Foundation hosts a Specialists Directory that lists professionals with prior experience or relevant expertise in helping those with HPPD.

Prevalence
Estimates in the 1960s and 1970s were around 1 in 20 for intermittent HPPD among regular users of hallucinogens. In a 2010 study of psychedelic users, 23.9% reported constant HPPD-like effects, though only 4.2% considered seeking treatment due to the severity. In a 2022 double-blind, placebo-controlled study, 142 subjects received LSD, psilocybin, or both, reported no cases of HPPD, and up to 9.2% of the subjects had flashbacks which were "transient, mostly experienced as benign and did not impair daily life".

Society and culture
In the second episode of the first season of the 2014 series True Detective ("Seeing Things"), primary character Rustin Cohle (Matthew McConaughey) is depicted as having symptoms similar to HPPD such as light tracers as a result of "neurological damage" from substance use.

American journalist Andrew Callaghan, former host of the internet series All Gas No Brakes and current host of Channel 5, revealed during a 2021 interview with Vice News that he experiences the symptoms of HPPD as a result of psilocybin use at a young age. Describing his symptoms, he noted that he experiences persistent visual snow and palinopsia.

American Youtuber and musician Matt Watson, known for cohosting the Youtube channel with over 1 million subscribers known as SuperMega, has revealed in a podcast interview with bbno$ that he contracted HPPD as a result of LSD use at the age of 22. He stated that he experiences several persistent floaters in his vision, constant visual "static," and various other symptoms associated with HPPD.

References

External links 

Effects of psychoactive drugs
Substance-related disorders